was a Japanese artist. After studying art with the two Japanese masters of Yōga art at his time, namely Kanokogi Takeshiro and then Asai Chū, Kuroda went to Europe from 1914 to 1918 and intensified his Western-style painting practice, adopting a style most closely following the style of French painter Camille Pissarro. It was on his second journey that he became a pupil of the French Cubist artist André Lhote. Upon his return to Japan, Kuroda introduced Cubism to his homeland and became a central figure in the art circles in Kyoto from the late Meiji to the Showa era as a particularly accomplished water-colourist and oil painter.

See also
List of Yōga painters

References

1887 births
1970 deaths
Japanese painters
Artists from Shiga Prefecture